Ginda'i (also spelled Gindae) is a reservoir located in the Kilte Awula’ilo woreda of the Tigray Region in Ethiopia. The earthen dam that holds the reservoir was built in 1998 by SAERT.

Dam characteristics 
 Dam height: 19.5 metres
 Dam crest length: 483 metres
 Spillway width: 23.2 metres

Capacity 
 Original capacity: 793170 m³
 Dead storage: 142405 m³
 Reservoir area: 13.5 ha
In 2002, the life expectancy of the reservoir (the duration before it is filled with sediment) was estimated at 20 years.

Irrigation 
 Designed irrigated area: 54 ha
 Actual irrigated area in 2002: 6 ha

Environment 
The catchment of the reservoir is 11.16 km² large. A net erosion map for the Ginda’i catchment shows that sediment deposition occurs at the footslopes, while the maximum erosion rate (more than 150 tonnes per hectare per year) occurred on the steepest slopes. Erosion rates in the cultivated lands are often low, as in the Ginda’i catchment croplands are generally located on slopes which are less than 5% steep. The reservoir suffers from rapid siltation. Part of the water that could be used for irrigation is lost through seepage; the positive side-effect is that this contributes to groundwater recharge.

References 

Reservoirs in Ethiopia
1998 establishments in Ethiopia
Tigray Region
Agriculture in Ethiopia
Water in Ethiopia